General Council elections were held in Niger on 15 December 1946, with a second round of voting on 5 January 1947. The General Council had been established by decree on 25 October 1946.

Electoral system
The 30 seats in the General Council were elected using two colleges. The first college was restricted to French citizens and elected ten members from two constituencies. The second college was for Africans, and elected twenty members from nine constituencies, which were based on the regions, which included Fada N'Gourma and Dori, both of which were transferred to Upper Volta in September 1947.

Campaign
The campaign for the elections was based primarily on the clientele of local leaders rather than political parties or manifestos.

Results

Aftermath
Following the elections, Moumouni Aouta was elected as the Council's first President. On 6 February 1952 the Council was converted into the Territorial Assembly, and fresh elections were held in March.

References

1946-47
1946 elections in Africa
1947 elections in Africa
1946 in Niger
1947 in Niger
1946